Roberto De Marchi (born 20 August 1896, date of death unknown) was an Italian wrestler. He competed in the Greco-Roman lightweight event at the 1924 Summer Olympics.

References

External links
 

1896 births
Year of death missing
Olympic wrestlers of Italy
Wrestlers at the 1924 Summer Olympics
Italian male sport wrestlers
Sportspeople from Genoa